Luth, Lüth or LUTH may refer to:

People
Erich Lüth (1902–1989), German writer and film director.
Tom Luth (born 1954), comic series colorist
Wolfgang Lüth (1913–1945), German U-boat commander of World War II.

Other uses
 Leatherback sea turtle
 Luth Enchantee (foaled 1980), French Thoroughbred racehorse
 Lagos University Teaching Hospital, located in Idi-Araba, Surulere, Lagos State, Nigeria
 Tabung Haji, formerly known as Lembaga Urusan dan Tabung Haji
 Lute, musical instrument, from French usage

See also
 Luther (disambiguation)
 Luthier (disambiguation)